Elections for local government were held in Northern Ireland in 1981, contesting 526 seats in all.

Results

Overall

By council

Antrim

Ards

Armagh

Ballymena

Ballymoney

Banbridge

Belfast

Carrickfergus

Castlereagh

Coleraine

Cookstown

Craigavon

Down

Dungannon

Fermanagh

Larne

Limavady

Lisburn

Londonderry

Magherafelt

Moyle

Newry and Mourne

Newtownabbey

North Down

Omagh

Strabane

References

 
Council elections in Northern Ireland
Northern
1981 elections in Northern Ireland